The Maryland Department of Transportation (MDOT) is an organization comprising five business units and one Authority:

 Maryland Transportation Authority (Transportation Secretary serves as chairman of the Maryland Transportation Authority)
 Maryland Transit Administration
 Maryland Port Administration
 State Highway Administration
 Maryland Motor Vehicle Administration
 Maryland Aviation Administration

Secretaries of Transportation 
2023–present, Paul Wiedefeld
2022–2023, James F. Ports Jr.
2020–2022, Gregory I. Slater
2015–2020, Pete K. Rahn
2013–2015, James T. Smith Jr.
2012–2013, Darrell Mobley (Acting Secretary)
2009–2012, Beverley K. Swaim-Staley
2007–2009, John D. Porcari
2003–2007, Robert L. Flanagan
1999–2003, John D. Porcari
1995–1998, David L. Winstead
1991–1994, O. James Lighthizer
1987–1991, Richard H. Trainor
1984–1987, William K. Hellmann
1981–1984, Lowell K. Bridwell
1979–1981, James J. O'Donnell
1977–1979, Herman K. Intemann
1971–1977, Harry R. Hughes

References

External links

Official website
Maryland MVA
Biographies of former Secretaries

 
State departments of transportation of the United States
Transportation in Maryland
Motor vehicle registration agencies
1971 establishments in Maryland
Government agencies established in 1971